Pseudogobiopsis tigrellus, the Tiger goby, is a species of goby endemic to Indonesia where it is only known from the Mamberamo River, Irian Jaya, Indonesia.  This species can reach a length of  SL.

References

Pseudogobiopsis
Freshwater fish of Western New Guinea
Taxonomy articles created by Polbot
Fish described in 1951